Beaver Creek State Forest is a state forest in Madison County, New York, United States. It comprises a lowland swamp drained by Beaver Creek and surrounded by forested hills. In addition to native trees these forests contain managed plantations of conifers like Japanese Larch, maintained to provide forest resources like timber and seeds.

It includes  of mixed-use recreational trails in the hills and around the perimeter of the swamp. These are part of the larger Brookfield Trail System, which contains  of trails spanning Beaver Creek, Charles E. Baker, and Brookfield Railroad state forests.

References

External links
  Map and photographs of the state forest's trail system.

New York (state) state forests
Protected areas of Madison County, New York